Hami Airport or Kumul Airport  is an airport serving the city of Hami (Kumul) in Xinjiang Uygur Autonomous Region, China. First built in 1934 and later used as a military airport, the airport was expanded in 2008 and is now for mixed military and public use.

Airlines and destinations

See also
List of airports in China
List of the busiest airports in China

References

Airports in Xinjiang
Hami
Airports established in 1934
1934 establishments in China